This is a list of quick breads. Quick bread is any bread leavened with some leavening agents other than yeast or eggs. Preparing a quick bread generally involves two mixing bowls. One contains all dry ingredients (including chemical leavening agents or agent) and one contains all wet ingredients (possibly including liquid ingredients that are slightly acidic in order to initiate the leavening process). In some variations, the dry ingredients are in a bowl and the wet ingredients are heated sauces in a saucepan off-heat and cooled.

Quick breads

  – consumed mainly in central Tibet
  
  – variety of flat quick bread or any large, round article baked or cooked from grain
  
  
  
 Boortsog – a traditional fried dough food found in the cuisines of Central Asia, Idel-Ural, and Mongolia
  
  
 
  
 Egg waffle – spherical egg waffle popular in Hong Kong and Macao
  – any of various quadrant-shaped flatbreads and cakes, traditionally made by cutting a round into four pieces
 
  
  
 Lángos – Hungarian deep-fried flatbread made of a dough with flour, yeast, salt and water
  – spongy pastry from Spain similar to a muffin, but flatter
  
  – French cake or quick bread
 
  – Balkan quick bread
  – Australian puffed scone
  
  
  
 Soda bread – variety of quick bread traditionally made in a variety of cuisines in which sodium bicarbonate (otherwise known as baking soda) is used as a leavening agent instead of the more common yeast
 
 
 Waffle – Batter or dough-based food cooked between two patterned, shaped plates
 Zucchini bread
 Zucchini slice, a quickbread-like dish popular in Australia

See also

 List of baked goods
 List of bread rolls
 List of breads
 List of cakes
 List of pancakes
 List of pastries
 List of sweet breads
 List of toast dishes

References

 
Lists of breads